Apex was a lumber town on the Grand Canyon Railway situated in Coconino County, Arizona.

Men without families would typically live in camps moving with the cutting activity, while families lived in a community at Apex station.
The settlement had its own school and telephone service. Many of the workers and their families were from Sweden and Norway. Lumber operations by the Saginaw and Manistee Lumber Company ended in 1936 and it was abandoned.

The school at Apex, along with the neighboring one at the mining town of Anita, were at one time the only racially integrated schools in Arizona.

References

Populated places in Coconino County, Arizona
Ghost towns in Arizona